Mahomet may refer to:

People
Muhammad (in Medieval Latin, French, and archaically in English)
Albert Mahomet (born 1858, died unknown), Anglo-Indian photographer, teacher, and Methodist preacher
Sake Dean Mahomet, an 18th-century Bengali traveler
Mahomet Weyonomon, a Native American tribal chieftain of the Mohegan tribe from Connecticut

Other uses
Mahomet (play), by Voltaire
Mahomet, Illinois, a village in the United States